Richard Barrett Connolly (1810 Dunmanway, County Cork, Ireland – May 30, 1880 Marseille, France) was an American politician from New York.

Life
He came to New York City in 1826, and worked first for auctioneers John Haggerty & Sons, and later for merchant Simeon Draper, Haggerty's son-in-law. In 1837, Connolly married Maria S. Townsend (1816–1879), and they had four children. In 1845, Collector of the Port Cornelius Van Wyck Lawrence appointed Connolly as a clerk in the customs house. In 1849, he became a discount clerk of the Bank of North America.

As a Tammany Hall Democrat, he was Clerk of New York County from 1853 to 1858; and a member of the New York State Senate (7th D.) from 1860 to 1863, sitting in the 83rd, 84th, 85th and 86th New York State Legislatures. Afterwards he became a discount clerk of the Central National Bank.

He was elected New York City Comptroller in 1867, and became a member of the infamous "Tweed Ring."Some newspaper writers referred to him at that time as "Slippery Dick". He was re-appointed by Mayor A. Oakey Hall as City Comptroller under the "Tweed Charter" and remained in office until his resignation on November 18, 1871. A week later, Connolly was arrested and later indicted on 15 counts of misdemeanors. On New Year's Day, 1872, he was released on bail by Judge George G. Barnard, and went abroad, never to return to the United States.

He died from Bright's disease in Marseille, France, while being a fugitive from justice.

Sources
 The New York Civil List compiled by Franklin Benjamin Hough, Stephen C. Hutchins and Edgar Albert Werner (1867; pg. 442 and 535)
 Biographical Sketches of the State Officers and Members of the Legislature of the State of New York by William D. Murphy (1861; pg. 45ff)
 Appointment of Richard B. Connolly as Controller in NYT on April 28, 1870
 AT THREE SCORE AND TEN; RICHARD B. CONNOLLY'S DEATH AT MARSEILLES in NYT on June 1, 1880

External links
 

1810 births
1880 deaths
19th-century Irish people
Democratic Party New York (state) state senators
Leaders of Tammany Hall
Politicians from County Cork
New York City Comptrollers
Deaths from kidney disease
19th-century American politicians
19th-century American businesspeople